María del Rosario Fernández (1755–1803), was a Spanish stage actress. She is regarded as one of the most notable stage actors of Spain during her period, and was known as La Tirana.

Notes

1755 births
1803 deaths
18th-century Spanish actresses
Spanish stage actresses